The Newspaper Publication Act  1798 (38 Geo. III, c. 78) was an Act passed by the British Parliament. The Act restricted the printing and circulation of newspapers and made newspaper proprietors identify themselves to the government. The Act aimed to reduce slander. When this Act was passed, it was considered an intolerable act.

References

Great Britain Acts of Parliament 1798